Umaglia Kancanangai Shyam Dhuleep, (born 1 July 1976) commonly known as U. K. Shyam, is a retired Singaporean track and field athlete and current national 100m record holder of Singapore.

He attended St. Andrew's Secondary School and Raffles Junior College, and went on to do a double degree in Philosophy and Political Science at the National University of Singapore.

He holds the Singaporean national record over the 100m with a timing of 10.37s. He broke the 33-year-old record of 10.38s (set by C. Kunalan) at the World University Games in Beijing in 2001. He equalled his own national record soon after at the 2001 Southeast Asian Games in Kuala Lumpur.

Athletics career 
Shyam joined the national track and field team in 1992.

At the 1997 Southeast Asian Games, Shyam won the bronze medal in the 4×100 metres relay.

In 2000, he quit the national team after a dispute over his education funding but rejoined the team in 2001. He went on to win the Hong Kong Open with 10.45s and qualified for the 2001 Southeast Asian Games in Kuala Lumpur. He clinched the silver medal in the 100m race with 10.37s, equalling the national record he created earlier in the year.

In 2003, Shyam took part in the 2003 Southeast Asian Games and won the silver medal in the 4×100 metres relay with Lin Jingze, Hamkah Afik and Poh Seng Song.

At the 2005 Southeast Asian Games, Shyam won the bronze medal in the 4×100 metres relay.

He retired from athletics in 2005.

Post athletics career 
After retirement from sprinting, Shyam went on to teach philosophy at a junior college. He subsequently became an English teacher at Raffles Institution.

In 2018, Shyam released a book, written by former national sprinter Kenneth Khoo, Running On Empty: The Story Behind 0.01s, detailing his athletics career. Shyam and Khoo donated their royalties from the book to the Chiam See Tong Sports Fund.

Personal life 
Shyam is married to Chia Hui Ping.

Achievements

Obtained IAAF world ranking in Men's 100m in 2001
 Qualified for Athens Olympics 2004 – B qualifier
 Ranked 2nd in Southeast Asia for the 100m Men's Sprint event in 2001
Asian Games 2002 (Korea, Busan) 100m Men's sprint event Semi-finalist
23rd SEA Games (Manila, 2005) – 100m Men's sprint event Finalist
1st athlete to be placed on Singapore Sports Council's inaugural Athlete Career Training Programme (ACT Scheme) Programme was launched and conferred by then Deputy Prime Minister Goh Chok Tong.
Ranked 1st in Singapore for the 100m Men's Sprint event from 2001 to 2003
Singapore Sports Council Awards Meritorious Award winner (Senior) 2001
Individual Award Recipient for Sporting Singapore Inspiration Awards 2006.
Winner of the Public Sports Medal 2011
Holland Village Celebrity Silver Medal Winner 2011 "Poser Fun Award Category"
Singapore 100m record holder

Ambassadorships and scholarships
Recipient of International Olympic Council (IOC) Olympic Solidarity Fund Scholarship 2002
Tag Heuer Ambassador for Singapore (2001–2003)
NIKE Ambassador for Singapore (1994, 1995, 2001 – present)
Anti-Smoking Campaign Ambassador for Singapore (2002)
One of the Ambassadors for Singapore Sports School

Bibliography

References

External links

1976 births
Singaporean male sprinters
Saint Andrew's School, Singapore alumni
Raffles Junior College alumni
Living people
Athletes (track and field) at the 2002 Asian Games
Southeast Asian Games medalists in athletics
Southeast Asian Games silver medalists for Singapore
Southeast Asian Games bronze medalists for Singapore
Competitors at the 1997 Southeast Asian Games
Competitors at the 2001 Southeast Asian Games
Competitors at the 2003 Southeast Asian Games
Competitors at the 2005 Southeast Asian Games
Asian Games competitors for Singapore